Mi Diario (My Diary) is a Spanish-language daily newspaper published in Panama City, Panama.

External links
  Mi Diario

Newspapers published in Panama
Mass media in Panama City